The Canada women's national tennis represents Canada in Billie Jean King Cup (previously known as the Federation Cup and the Fed Cup) tennis competition since 1963. They are overseen by Tennis Canada, the governing body of tennis in Canada.

Canada has reached the semifinals in 1988, and the quarterfinals on four occasions in 1964, 1967, 1987 and 2015. It has also only missed one competition since the inaugural competition in 1963.

History

1963–1994: Appearances in the World Group quarterfinals and semifinals
Canada played its first tie in 1963 when the team of Ann Barclay and Louise Brown was defeated 0–3 by Great Britain in World Group first round. Canada and its team of Benita Senn, Vicki Berner and Louise Brown reached the World Group quarterfinals in 1964 with a 2–1 victory over Sweden in the second round, but was defeated 0–3 the next round by Australia. In 1967, Canada made it again to the World Group quarterfinals after beating Switzerland 2–1 in the opening round, but was defeated this time 0–3 by Germany. Team members were Susan Butt, Vicki Berner and Faye Urban.

In 1987, Canada reached the third World Group quarterfinal of its history. The team of Helen Kelesi, Carling Bassett-Seguso and Jill Hetherington defeated Netherlands 3–0 in the first round and the Soviet Union 2–1 in the second round. They were however eliminated 1–2 by Czechoslovakia. Canada had its better run to date when Rene Simpson, Helen Kelesi and Jill Hetherington helped the country reach the World Group semifinals in 1988. Canada beat South Korea 2–1 and Finland 3–0 in the first and second rounds respectively, and then Sweden 3–0 in the quarterfinals. Their run was ended by Czechoslovakia with a score of 0–3.

1995–2009: Moderate success
In 1995, Canada had its second best result with the new World Group format when they made it to the World Group I playoffs after beating Italy 3–2 in the World Group II first round. The squad of Jana Nejedly, Patricia Hy-Boulais, Jill Hetherington and Rene Simpson were then defeated 0–5 by Japan.

In 2006, Canada earned its spot back in the World Group II when team members Aleksandra Wozniak, Stéphanie Dubois and Marie-Ève Pelletier beat Argentina 3–2 in the World Group II playoffs. They were eliminated in the first round the next year by Israel 2–3. Canada was not able to secure its place in the World Group II for the second straight year as the team was eliminated by Argentina in the World Group II playoffs later that year.

2010–13: World Group II contender
In 2010, Canada (team members were Aleksandra Wozniak, Marie-Ève Pelletier, Valérie Tétreault and Sharon Fichman) won the World Group II playoff over Argentina by the convincing score of 5–0 and regained the World Group II.

In the World Group II first round in 2011, Rebecca Marino won the opening match over Aleksandra Krunić and Aleksandra Wozniak lost the second one to Bojana Jovanovski. The next day, Marino lost the third rubber to Jovanovski, but Wozniak tied the meeting thanks to a win over Ana Jovanović. Canada's doubles team of Sharon Fichman and Marie-Ève Pelletier was however eliminated by Jovanovski and Krunić to give the win 3–2 to Serbia. Canada then had to play a playoff to stay in the World Group II for the second straight year, but lost a close tie to Slovenia 2–3.

In 2013, Canada was promoted to the World Group II for the first time since 2011 when the team of Eugenie Bouchard, Gabriela Dabrowski, Sharon Fichman and Stéphanie Dubois beat Ukraine 3–2 in the World Group II playoffs.

2014–15: Run to the World Group
In the first round of the World Group II in 2014, Wozniak won the first rubber over Vesna Dolonc. Bouchard then gave Canada a 2–0 lead after the first day when she beat Jovana Jakšić. In the third rubber the next day, Bouchard defeated Dolonc and secured the victory for Canada. Canadians Dabrowski and Fichman lost the doubles match to Jakšić and Stojanović to end the tie with a 3–1 score in favour of Canada. Canada next played a World Group I playoff in April against Slovakia, the first time since 2004. The first day, Wozniak upset No. 52 Jana Čepelová and Bouchard won her match over Kristína Kučová to end day one with a 2–0 lead for Canada. Bouchard then won her next match the following day over Čepelová to clinch the tie for the host country with an insurmountable 3–0 lead. The win means Canada has its place in the World Group I next year, the first time ever for the country since the introduction of the new World Group format in 1995. Slovaks Janette Husárová and Anna Karolína Schmiedlová beat the Canadian duo of Dabrowski and Fichman to close the meeting with a 3–1 score for Canada.

Canada played their 2015 World Group first round against the reigning champions and number one seed the Czech Republic at home. The team, without its two best players Bouchard and Wozniak in its ranks, lost the four matches of the meeting. Canada had to host Romania in a World Group playoff in April to stay in the World Group for the next year. Françoise Abanda surprised No. 33 Irina-Camelia Begu in the first match, her first Fed Cup win, but Bouchard was upset by Alexandra Dulgheru in the second to end day one in a 1–1 tie. Bouchard and Abanda both lost their matches the next day (to Mitu and Dulgheru respectively) to give the win to Romania. Dabrowski and Fichman defeated the Romanian doubles team of Mitu and Olaru to end the meeting with a 3–2 score in favour of Romania.

2016 to present: Short relegation to the Americas Zone and return to the World Group II
Canada next played a World Group II first round tie at home against Belarus in February 2016, but lost the meeting by a score of 2–3. Canada then played a playoff in April 2016 to secure its place in the World Group II for the next year, but lost a fourth tie in a row with a score of 3–2 for Slovakia. They were relegated in the Americas Zone Group I for 2017, the first time since 2013.

In February 2017, the team of Bianca Andreescu, Charlotte Robillard-Millette, Katherine Sebov and Carol Zhao defeated respectively Venezuela, Bolivia and Paraguay in the Round Robin, and Chile in the promotional playoff. Canada next played in April 2017 at the World Group II Play-offs against Kazakhstan. Françoise Abanda won her two singles matches over world No. 51 Yaroslava Shvedova and world No. 31 Yulia Putintseva. 16-year-old Bianca Andreescu lost her first rubber to Putintseva but defeated Shvedova in the second. The doubles team of Gabriela Dabrowski and Katherine Sebov lost the final rubber to Kamila Kerimbayeva and Galina Voskoboeva. Canada won the tie 3-2 and will be back in the World Group II in 2018.

In 2018, the team of Bianca Andreescu, Gabriela Dabrowski, Katherine Sebov and Carol Zhao lost in the first round of the World Group II first round to Romania by the score of 1-3. Zhao and Andreescu lost the two singles matches the first day, respectively to Sorana Cîrstea and Irina-Camelia Begu. The second day, Sebov was defeated by Begu and Canada's doubles team of Dabrowski and Zhao won over Ana Bogdan and Raluca Olaru. In the World Group II Play-offs, Andreescu lost the first rubber in three sets to world No. 40 Lesia Tsurenko and Bouchard won her two singles matches over Kateryna Bondarenko and Tsurenko. Dabrowski lost the fourth singles match to Bondarenko, sending the tie to a decisive doubles match. The team of Andreescu and Dabrowski won over Bondarenko and Olga Savchuk to secure Canada's place in the World Group II for a second straight year.

Current team
Rankings as of September 9, 2019

Players

*Active players in bold, statistics as of September 9, 2019

Recent performances
Here is the list of all match-ups since 1995, when the competition started being held in the current World Group format.

1990s

2000s

2010s

2020s

Head-to-head record

*Previous champions in bold. Teams that have been ranked No. 1 in italics. Statistics as of September 9, 2019

See also

List of Canada Fed Cup team representatives
Fed Cup
Tennis Canada
Canada Davis Cup team
Canada at the Hopman Cup

References

External links

Tennis Canada

Billie Jean King Cup teams
Fed Cup
Fed Cup